Kendriya Muslim Sahitya Sangsad (Sylhet Central Muslim Literary Society) is a literary organisation located in Sylhet, Bangladesh. It is the one of the oldest organisations of its kind in the Indian sub-continent and the oldest in Bangladesh. It was founded on 16 September 1936 by Muhammad Nurul Haque. It has the largest non-government collection of books, magazines, inscriptions etc. Some of them date back to the 13th century AD.

The former presidents of the organisation include many writers, critics and poets from Sylhet such as Syed Mujtaba Ali, Dewan Mohammad Azraf and Dilwar Khan.

References

Libraries in Bangladesh
Organisations based in Sylhet
1936 establishments in India
Literary societies